The Arlington Cup (Japanese アーリントンカップ) is a Grade 3 horse race for three-year-old Thoroughbreds run in April over a distance of 1600 metres at Hanshin Racecourse.

The race was first run in 1992 and has held Grade 3 status ever since. It serves as a trial race for the NHK Mile Cup. Past winners of the race have included Eishin Preston, Tanino Gimlet, Just A Way and Mikki Isle.

Winners since 2000  

 The 2019 winner Iberis was a filly.

Earlier winners

 1992 - El Casa River
 1993 - Grand Shingeki
 1994 - Merci Stage
 1995 - Eishin Berlin
 1996 - Sugino Hayakaze
 1997 - Brave Tender
 1998 - Dublin Lion
 1999 - Eishin Cameron

See also
 Horse racing in Japan
 List of Japanese flat horse races

References

Turf races in Japan